Daniel Szelągowski (born 2 September 2002) is a Polish professional footballer who plays as a forward for Chojniczanka Chojnice, on loan from Raków Częstochowa.

Club career

Korona Kielce 
Szelągowski came through the youth ranks of Korona Kielce, where he played since 2011, making his professional debut on 18 May 2019, coming on as a substitute in a 0–3 home Ekstraklasa defeat against Górnik Zabrze.

Despite scoring twice in five league games during the 2019–20 season, Szelągowski could not prevent his team's from relegating to I liga. He subsequently moved to Raków Częstochowa in September 2020.

Raków Częstochowa 
Szelągowski made his debut for Raków on the 2 October 2020, coming on as a late substitute in a 3–0 home Ekstraklasa win against Wisła Płock.

He scored his first goal for his new team on the 22 November 2020, coming on as an 83rd-minute substitute for Marcin Cebula, and helping his team obtain a 3–3 away draw against Lech Poznań. His goal was a spectacular one, driving the ball from his own half, dribbling past multiple opponents and beating the goalkeeper to score in stoppage time.

Szelągowski was part of the side that won the 2020–21 Polish Cup, appearing in the final as a late substitute, providing the assist for David Tijanić's winning goal four minutes after he came in, helping his team beat Arka Gdynia 2–1.

Loan to Warta 
On 11 January 2022, as part of the deal that saw Szymon Czyż join Raków from Warta Poznań on a permanent basis, Szelągowski was loaned the opposite way until the end of the 2021–22 season.

Loan to Chojniczanka 
On 3 January 2022, he was sent on loan to I liga club Chojniczanka Chojnice until the end of the season. On 16 March 2023, it was announced he had suffered a anterior cruciate ligament injury and would be sidelined for approximately six months, thus ending his season prematurely.

International career 
Already capped with all Polish youth teams, Szelągowski made his debut for the under-21 team on the 26 March 2021 in a friendly game against Saudi Arabia, where he provided four assists in a 7–0 win.

Career statistics

Honours

Club
Raków Częstochowa
 Polish Cup: 2020–21, 2021–22
 Polish Super Cup: 2021

References

External links

2002 births
Living people
Polish footballers
Poland youth international footballers
Poland under-21 international footballers
Association football forwards
Sportspeople from Kielce
Raków Częstochowa players
Korona Kielce players
Warta Poznań players
Chojniczanka Chojnice players
Ekstraklasa players
I liga players